Butte Lake is a lake located in the northeast section of Lassen Volcanic National Park in the U.S. state of California at an elevation of .

Description
The irregularly-shaped lake lies at the northern end of Cinder Cone and the Fantastic Lava Beds, which is a complex of lava flows and a cinder cone. Lava from Cinder Cone's 1666 eruption flowed into and around the lake. This formed an underwater lava field. Water from Snag Lake to the south flows through the porous lava field to Butte Lake.  Water from Butte Lake drains via Butte Creek, which flows north out of the parkland.

Access
There is a campground and ranger station located to the west of the lake. Butte Lake is accessible via an unpaved road which branches off from California Route 44. The unpaved road is subject to seasonal closures.

See also
 List of lakes in California
 Cascade Volcanoes

References

External links
 
  Recreation.gov: Butte Lake, CA

Lakes of Lassen Volcanic National Park
Lakes of Lassen County, California
Lakes of California
Lakes of Northern California